Claude Bertrand may refer to:

 Claude Bertrand (neurosurgeon) (1917–2014), Canadian neurosurgeon
 Claude Bertrand (actor) (1919–1986), French actor